Michele Scarica (born 17 March 1982) is an Italian former swimmer who competed in the 2004 Summer Olympics.

References

1982 births
Living people
Italian male swimmers
Italian male freestyle swimmers
Olympic swimmers of Italy
Swimmers at the 2004 Summer Olympics
Mediterranean Games gold medalists for Italy
Mediterranean Games medalists in swimming
Swimmers at the 2001 Mediterranean Games